Deutsch Evern is a municipality in the district of Lüneburg, in Lower Saxony, Germany. Deutsch Evern has an area of 11.16 km² and a population of 3,683 (as of December 31, 2007).

References